Natural Selection is a 2016 American drama film written and directed by Chad Scheifele, and starring Mason Dye, Ryan Munzert, Anthony Michael Hall, Katherine McNamara and Amy Carlson. It is based on Scheifele's 2009 short film of the same name.

Plot
Tyler and his mother Laura are recent arrivals in town. As the new kid in the local high school, Tyler is soon torn, being drawn in one direction by the local rebel Indrid, and in another by Paige, a sweet girl who tutors some of the local students.

Cast
Mason Dye as Tyler
Ryan Munzert as Indrid
Anthony Michael Hall as Mr. Stevenson
Katherine McNamara as Paige
Amy Carlson as Laura
Tyler Elliot Burke as Matt
Esther Zyskind as Angela
Ryan Boudreau as Steve
Michael Nikolich as Wesley
Anthony Del Negro as Brian
Tyler Garamella as Josh
Anna Friedman as Samantha
Catherine Missal as Tiffany
 Makenzie Hughes as Catherine

Reception
John DeFore of The Hollywood Reporter gave the film a negative review and wrote, "Failing to live up to the itchy possibilities of that premise, this debut feature plays like a glum after-school special whose jealousies and painful secrets project little heat. Theatrical prospects are poor, and, with supporting player Anthony Michael Hall the most familiar name in the cast, its appeal on video is not much stronger." Michael Rechtshaffen of the Los Angeles Times also gave the film a negative review and wrote "There’s little that comes off as 'natural' in Natural Selection, a stiffly heavy-handed, drawn-out, faith-based drama about a Christ-like teen struggling to find his true path."

References

External links
 
 

2016 films
American coming-of-age drama films
2010s coming-of-age drama films
Features based on short films
Films about school violence
2010s high school films
2016 drama films
2010s English-language films
2010s American films